Rudolph Minkowski (born Rudolf Leo Bernhard Minkowski ; ; May 28, 1895 – January 4, 1976) was a German-American astronomer.

Biography

Minkowski was the son of Marie Johanna Siegel and physiologist Oskar Minkowski. His uncle was Hermann Minkowski, a mathematician and one of Einstein's teachers in Zürich. Rudolph studied supernovae and, together with Walter Baade, divided them into two classes (Type I and Type II) based on their spectral characteristics. He and Baade also found optical counterparts to various radio sources.

He headed the National Geographic Society – Palomar Observatory Sky Survey, a photographic atlas of the entire northern sky (and down to declination -22°) up to an apparent magnitude of 22.

Together with Albert George Wilson, he co-discovered the near-Earth Apollo asteroid 1620 Geographos in 1951, and he also discovered Planetary Nebula M2-9.  He additionally discovered a correlation between the luminosity of early-type galaxies and their velocity dispersion, which was later quantified by Faber and Jackson.  He won the Bruce Medal in 1961. The lunar crater Minkowski is named after him and his uncle.
Also the Minkowski 2-9, planetary nebula and the Minkowski's object dwarf galaxy near NGC 541 are named after him.

Bibliography

See also 
Hen 2-437
M2-42

References

External links 
 Short Biography 
 

1895 births
1976 deaths
20th-century American astronomers
Discoverers of asteroids
20th-century German astronomers
Jewish emigrants from Nazi Germany to the United States
People from Alsace-Lorraine
Scientists from Strasbourg